Ira H. Abbott (July 18, 1906 - November 3, 1988) was an American aerospace engineer. After graduating from MIT, Abbott started working for Langley Aeronautical Laboratory in 1929. He contributed significantly to the establishment of high-speed research programs and published numerous technical reports on aerodynamics. He eventually attained the post of assistant chief of research at Langley in 1945.

In 1948, he moved to National Advisory Committee for Aeronautics (NACA) Headquarters to work as the assistant director of research (aerodynamics), and in 1959 and 1961 he was elevated to the positions of director of advanced research programs in NASA and director of advanced research and technology. He was a Director of Aeronautical and Space Research at NASA between 1959 and 1962. As Assistant Director of NACA, Abbott was decisive in keeping Ames Research Center focused on research instead of moving into operations during the development of the proposed Orbiting Astronomical Observatory in 1960.

Abbott supervised the X-15, supersonic transport, nuclear rocket and advanced reentry programs. He retired in 1962.

In recognition for his "outstanding contributions" to airfoil research and his leadership, he was inducted into the first round of the NACA/NASA Hall of Fame on August 13, 2015.

Bibliography 
 Abbott co-authored the reference book Theory of Wing Sections, including a summary of airfoil data, with Albert E. von Doenhoff in 1949.

References

Further reading 
 "Test if a Highly Cambered Low-Drag-Airfoil Section with a Lift Control Flap, Special Report", 1942, NASA Technical Report Server.
 "Preliminary Investigation of Certain Laminar-Flow Airfoils for Application at High Speeds and Reynolds Numbers", 1939, NASA Technical Report Server.
 "Summary of Airfoil Data ",1945, NASA Technical Report Server
 "Pressure-Distribution Measurements of a Model of a Davis Wing Section with Fowler Flap Submitted by Consolidated Aircraft Corporation",1942, NASA Technical Report Server.
 "The NACA variable-density wind tunnel",1933,NASA Technical Report Server.
 "The design of low-turbulence wind tunnels",1949,NASA Technical Report Server.
 "Fuselage-drag tests in the variable-density wind tunnel: streamline bodies of revolution, fineness ratio of 5",1937, NASA Technical Report Server.
 "Title: Pressure-distribution measurements of two airfoil models with Fowler flaps submitted by Consolidated Aircraft Corporation as alternative wing sections of the XB-32 airplane",1942,NASA Technical Report Server.
 "Tests in the variable-density wind tunnel of the NACA 23012 airfoil with plain and split flaps",1939,NASA Technical Report Server.
 "Experiments with a model water tunnel",1930, NASA Technical Report Server.
 "Aerodynamic characteristics of NACA 23012 and 23021 airfoils with 20-percent-chord external-airfoil flaps of NACA 23012 section",1937,NASA Technical Report Server.
 "Airship model tests in the variable density wind tunnel",1932,NASA Technical Report Server.
 "Airfoil section data obtained in the NACA variable-density tunnel as affected by support interference and other corrections",1939,NASA Technical Report Server.
 "The design of low-turbulence wind tunnels",1949, NASA Technical Report Server.
 " The drag of two streamline bodies as affected by protuberances and appendages",1934,NASA Technical Report Server.
 " Tests of four models representing intermediate sections of the XB-33 airplane including sections with slotted flap and ailerons",1942, NASA Technical Report Server.
 "Interference effects of longitudinal flat plates on low-drag airfoils",1942,NASA Technical Report Server.
 "Flow observations with tufts and lampblack of the stalling of four typical airfoil sections in the NACA variable-density tunnel",1938, NASA Technical Report Server.
 
 "Ira H. Abbott." NASA CRgis. Updated 3 June 2015.

1906 births
1988 deaths
Massachusetts Institute of Technology alumni
American aerospace engineers
NASA people
20th-century American engineers